Songs of Inspiration II is the twenty-first studio album and the second gospel album by American country music group Alabama,  released on March 27, 2007. It was their final studio album for the RCA Records label. The album peaked at No. 33 in Billboard 200 album charts., No. on the Christian Album chart and No. 3 on the Country Albums chart.

Track listing
 "I Am a Pilgrim" (Traditional; arr. Randy Owen) - 4:21
 "Church in the Wildwood" (Traditional; arr. Owen) - 3:01
 "Will the Circle Be Unbroken?" (Ada R. Habershon, Charles H. Gabriel) - 4:45
 "If I Could Hear My Mother Pray Again" (John Whitfield Vaughan, James Rowe; arr. Randy Owen) - 3:20
 "Suppertime" (Ira Stanphill) - 2:50
 "Down by the Riverside" (Traditional; arr. Owen) - 2:49
 "Precious Memories" (J.B.F. Wright, Lonnie B. Combs; arr. Owen) - 3:50
 "Lonesome Valley" (Traditional; arr. Owen) - 2:49
 "The Refrain of John Dillon James" (Ronnie Rogers) - 3:41
 "Love Lifted Me" (Rowe, Howard E. Smith; arr. Owen) - 3:17
 "When It Comes My Time" (Teddy Gentry) - 3:24
 "One Life" (Buck Moore, Eric Todd) - 2:55
 "The Star-Spangled Banner" (Francis Scott Key, John Stafford Smith; arr. Owen) - 2:03

Personnel

Alabama
 Jeff Cook – electric guitar, vocals
 Teddy Gentry – bass guitar, vocals 
 Randy Owen – acoustic guitar, electric guitar, vocals

Additional Musicians

 David Angell – violin
 Monisa Angell – viola
 Eddie Bayers – drums, percussion
 Jason Carter – fiddle
 Kristen Cassell – cello
 Mark Casstevens – banjo, dobro, acoustic guitar, harmonica
 John Catchings – cello
 Bruce Christensen – viola
 Michael Curtis – background vocals
 Dan Dugmore – steel guitar
 Connie Ellisor – violin
 Carl Gorodetzky – string contractor, violin
 Jim Grosjean – viola
 Aubrey Haynie – fiddle, mandolin
 Jim Horn – saxophone
 Randy Kohrs – dobro, acoustic guitar
 Anthony LaMarchina – cello
 Del McCoury – acoustic guitar, background vocals 
 Rob McCoury – banjo
 Ronnie McCoury – banjo, background vocals
 Joey Miskulin – accordion
 Craig Nelson – bass guitar
 Gary Van Osdale – viola 
 Mary Kathryn Van Osdale – violin
 Larry Paxton – arch guitar, acoustic bass guitar, bass guitar, electric guitar, nylon string guitar, string arrangements 
 Gary Prim – Hammond B-3 organ, piano, synthesizer
 Carole Rabinowitz-Neuen – cello
 Pamela Sixfin – violin
 Alan Umstead – violin
 Catherine Umstead – violin
 Kristin Wilkinson – string arrangements

Chart performance

Songs of Inspiration II peaked at #33 on Billboard 200, #3 on Billboard Country Albums, and #1 on Billboard Christian Albums.

Awards

In 2008, the album was nominated for a Dove Award for Country Album of the Year at the 39th GMA Dove Awards.

References

2007 albums
Alabama (American band) albums
RCA Records albums